The Only Road is a 1918 American silent Western film starring Viola Dana. It was produced and distributed by Metro Pictures and directed by Frank Reicher.

This picture is preserved at the BFI National Film and Television archive in London.

Plot
As described in a film magazine, Nita (Dana), in order to escape marrying Pedro Lupo (Blue), vainly calls for help and Bob Armstrong (Ferguson), who once before had rescued Nita from Pedro, again plays the hero. However, through the father of Pedro, a wrong light is placed upon this brave act such that Bob is forced to marry Nita. As Nita is of poor parentage while Bob is the son of a millionaire sent out west to gain his manhood, the match does not strike Bob as being a choice one, but the point of a pistol has considerable to do with his acquiescing. Nita is placed in a convent but escapes and, in the garb of a boy, seeks employment at the ranch where Bob is living. When found in the arms of her husband, the owner of the ranch, Clara Hawkins (Chapman), unaware of the inside facts, sends Nita away. Later explanations come and Nita turns out to be a child of Hawkins who she thought had died at childbirth. When love enters the heart of Bob, Nita finds happiness.

Cast
 Viola Dana as Nita
 Casson Ferguson as Bob Armstrong
 Edythe Chapman as Clara Hawkins
 Fred Huntley as Ramon Lupo
 Monte Blue as Pedro Lupo
 Paul Weigel as Manuel Lopez
 Marie Van Tassell as Rosa Lopez
 Gertrude Short as Bianca

Reception
Like many American films of the time, The Only Road was subject to restrictions and cuts by city and state film censorship boards. For example, the Chicago Board of Censors cut, in Reel 4, the binding of a man's hands, all views of putting rope around a man's neck, and all views of a man with a rope around his neck except the scene where the young woman shoots the rope.

References

External links

 
 

1918 films
1918 Western (genre) films
American black-and-white films
Metro Pictures films
Silent American Western (genre) films
Films directed by Frank Reicher
1910s American films
1910s English-language films